Read Silence is a digital-only EP compilation of three song remixes from TV on the Radio's third studio album, Dear Science. It was released on April 14, 2009, on Interscope Records.

Track listing
"Shout Me Out" (Willie Isz Remix by Jneiro Jarel) – 4:22
"Stork & Owl" (Gang Gang Dance Remix) – 7:31
"Red Dress" (The Glitch Mob Remix) – 5:26

References

2009 EPs
TV on the Radio albums
Interscope Records EPs
Experimental rock EPs